Joseph Wood (c. 1778 - June 15, 1830) was an American painter noted mainly for his portraits.

Wood was born near Clarkstown, New York, and in 1793 apprenticed to a silversmith. In 1801 he became a miniature painter and studied with Edward Greene Malbone. He then formed a partnership with John Wesley Jarvis, 1802-10, worked in Philadelphia from 1813–1816, then in Washington, D.C., from 1816–1830. In his later years he ran an art school and served as a draftsman for patent applications. He died in Washington, D.C.

References 
 The Capital Image: Painters in Washington, 1800–1915, by Andrew J. Cosentino and Henry H. Glassie, Washington, D.C., Smithsonian Institution Press for the National Museum of American Art, 1983.
 Smithsonian American Art Museum entry

American painters
1770s births
1830 deaths

Year of birth uncertain